Miran Savnik is a male former international table tennis player from Yugoslavia.

Table tennis career
He won the golden medal in the Cadets category - individuals- at the European Youth Championship held in Vejle, Denmark in 1972. 
He also won a silver medal at the 1975 World Table Tennis Championships with Milivoj Karakašević, Zoran Kosanović, Antun Stipančić and Dragutin Šurbek as part of the Yugoslav team.
He was later the head coach / trainer of the Maribor team - in his hometown of Maribor, Slovenia.

See also
 List of table tennis players
 List of World Table Tennis Championships medalists

References

Yugoslav table tennis players
Living people
World Table Tennis Championships medalists
Year of birth missing (living people)